The Right Revd Dintoe Stephen Letloenyane has been Bishop of the Free State since 2013. He was consecrated on the 9th of March 2013 at the University of the Free State.

Letloenyane was born in Kroonstad. He was ordained in 1997. He has served at St Matthias, Welkom; St Peters, Sasolburg and St Margaret, Bloemfontein.

Notes 

21st-century Anglican Church of Southern Africa bishops
Anglican bishops of the Free State
Living people
Year of birth missing (living people)